Panorama is the second studio album by Braintax, released in 2006.

Track listing
 "All I Need" - 3.33
 "Can We Skit" - 1.22
 "Syriana Style" - 3.38
 "Monsoon Funk" - 3.41
 "Good or Bad" (featuring Mystro) - 3.42
 "Anti-Grey" (featuring Dubbledge) - 2.59
 "Last Tenner" - 3.35
 "The Grip Again" (a day in the life of a suicide bomber) - 4.07
 "Pick a Subject" (featuring Verb T) - 2.57
 "Decade" - 3.57
 "Run the Yards" - 3.45
 "Back to the Riviera" - 2.58
 "Exit Plans" - 3.42

References

2006 albums
Albums produced by Beat Butcha
Braintax albums